The 2001–02 season in the Honduran Liga Nacional was divided into two phases, the Apertura tournament which lasted from September to December 2001, and the Clausura tournament which was played from January to May 2002. C.D. Motagua and C.D. Marathón each lifted one trophy obtaining the 39th and 40th national championship respectively in the history of the league. This was the fourth season under the Apertura and Clausura format.

2001–02 teams

 Deportes Savio (Santa Rosa de Copán)
 Marathón (San Pedro Sula)
 Motagua (Tegucigalpa)
 Olimpia (Tegucigalpa)
 Platense (Puerto Cortés)
 Real Comayagua (Comayagua) (promoted)
 Real España (San Pedro Sula)
 Universidad (Tegucigalpa)
 Victoria (La Ceiba)
 Vida (La Ceiba)

Apertura
The Apertura tournament started on 7 September 2001 in La Ceiba with a 2–1 Victoria's home win over last season runners Olimpia. After 18 rounds Motagua, Marathón, Platense, and Olimpia qualified to the Final round to fight for the title.

Regular season

Standings

Results
 As of 2 December 2001

Final round

Semifinals

Motagua vs Olimpia

 Motagua won 4–3 on aggregate.

Marathón vs Platense

 Marathón won 3–2 on aggregate.

Final

Motagua vs Marathón

 Motagua 3–3 Marathón on aggregate; Motagua won 5–3 on penalty shootouts.

Squads

Top goalscorers
8 goals
  Enrique Renau (Marathón)
7 goals

  Marcelo Verón (Motagua)
  Denilson Costa (Olimpia)

6 goals

  José Pacini (Motagua)
  Danilo Tosello (Olimpia)

5 goals

  Wilmer Velásquez (Olimpia)
  Pompilio Cacho (Marathón)
  Gustavo Fuentes (Olimpia)

Clausura
The Clausura tournament was the second part of the 2001–02 season in Liga Nacional; the league games started on 19 January 2002 in La Ceiba with an unexpected 0–3 C.D. Victoria's home defeat against Deportes Savio. The previous champions C.D. Motagua was unable to qualify to the Final round and C.D. Marathón earned its first title after 20 long years.

Regular season

Standings

Results
 As of 12 May 2002

Final round

Semifinals

Olimpia vs Victoria

 Olimpia won 3–2 on aggregate.

Platense vs Marathón

 Marathón won 2–1 on aggregate.

Final

Olimpia vs Marathón

 Marathón won 4–2 on aggregate.

Squads

Top goalscorers
13 goals
  Marcelo Ferreira (Platense)
10 goals
  Wilmer Velásquez (Olimpia)
7 goals

  Gustavo Fuentes (Olimpia)
  Elvis Scott (Marathón)

6 goals

  Denilson Costa (Olimpia)
  Carlos Múñoz (Real Comayagua)

5 goals

  Pompilio Cacho (Marathón)
  Enrique Reneau (Marathón)
  Emil Martínez (Marathón)
  Christian Martínez (Victoria)
  Danilo Tosello (Olimpia)
  Reynaldo Tilguath (Platense)
  Miguel Mariano (Victoria)
  Luis Oseguera (Victoria)

4 goals

  Clifford Laing (Platense)
  Francisco Ramírez (Motagua)

3 goals

  Carlos Oliva (Marathón)
  Jaime Rosales (Marathón)
  Jorge Pineda (Victoria)
  Carlos Güity (Vida)
  Marco Mejía (Real España)

2 goals

  Marlon Hernández (Universidad)
  Lester Marson (Savio)
  Milton Palacios (Victoria)
  Fabio Ulloa (Olimpia)
  Francis Reyes (Olimpia)

1 goal

  Ariel Leyes (Marathón)
  Walter López (Marathón)
  Óscar Vargas (Marathón)
  Nigel Zúniga (Marathón)
  Maynor Figueroa (Victoria)

Relegation table

References

Liga Nacional de Fútbol Profesional de Honduras seasons
1
Honduras